Dubalgundi  is a large village( Hobli) in Humnabad taluka of Bidar district in the Indian state of Karnataka.It is 15km from Humnabad and 40km from Bidar district.

Demographics
 India census, Dubalgundi had a population of 9475 with 4852 males and 4623 females.

See also
 Bidar
 Districts of Karnataka

References

External links
 http://Bidar.nic.in/

Villages in Bidar district